The Men's 400 metres hurdles at the 2014 Commonwealth Games, as part of the athletics programme, took place at Hampden Park between 29 and 31 July 2014.

Heat 1

Heat 2

Heat 3

Final

References

Men's 400 metres hurdles
2014